Demeioun "Chop" Robinson is an American football defensive end for the Penn State Nittany Lions.

Early life and high school career
Robinson has been nicknamed "Pork-chop", later shortened to "Chop" since he was born. He attended Quince Orchard High School in Gaithersburg, Maryland. He was selected to play in the 2020 Under Armour All-American Game. He committed to the University of Maryland, College Park to play college football.

College career

Maryland 
As a true freshman at Maryland in 2021, Robinson played in all 13 games with one start and had 19 tackles and two sacks.

Penn State 
After the season, Robinson transferred to Penn State University. In his first season there he played in 12 games and had 26 tackles and 5.5 sacks.

References

External links
Penn State Nittany Lions bio

Living people
Players of American football from Maryland
American football defensive ends
Maryland Terrapins football players
Penn State Nittany Lions football players